Cadmium sulfide is the inorganic compound with the formula CdS. Cadmium sulfide is a yellow solid. It occurs in nature with two different crystal structures as the rare minerals greenockite and hawleyite, but is more prevalent as an impurity substituent in the similarly structured zinc ores sphalerite and wurtzite, which are the major economic sources of cadmium. As a compound that is easy to isolate and purify, it is the principal source of cadmium for all commercial applications. Its vivid yellow color led to its adoption as a pigment for the yellow paint "cadmium yellow" in the 18th century.

Production
Cadmium sulfide can be prepared by the precipitation from soluble cadmium(II) salts with sulfide ion. This reaction has been used for gravimetric analysis and qualitative inorganic analysis.The preparative route and the subsequent treatment of the product, affects the polymorphic form that is produced (i.e., cubic vs hexagonal). It has been asserted that chemical precipitation methods result in the cubic zincblende form.

Pigment production usually involves the precipitation of CdS, the washing of the solid precipitate to remove soluble cadmium salts followed by calcination (roasting) to convert it to the hexagonal form followed by milling to produce a powder. When cadmium sulfide selenides are required the CdSe is co-precipitated with CdS and the cadmium sulfoselenide is created during the calcination step.

Cadmium sulfide is sometimes associated with sulfate reducing bacteria.

Routes to thin films of CdS
Special methods are used to produce films of CdS as components in some photoresistors and solar cells. In the chemical bath deposition method, thin films of CdS have been prepared using thiourea as the source of sulfide anions and an ammonium buffer solution to control pH: 
Cd2+  + H2O   +  (NH2)2CS  +  2 NH3  →   CdS  +  (NH2)2CO   +  2 NH4+

Cadmium sulfide can be produced using metalorganic vapour phase epitaxy and MOCVD techniques by the reaction of dimethylcadmium with diethyl sulfide: 
Cd(CH3)2  + Et2S  →   CdS  +  CH3CH3   +  C4H10
Other methods to produce films of CdS include
Sol–gel techniques
Sputtering
Electrochemical deposition
Spraying with precursor cadmium salt, sulfur compound and dopant
Screen printing using a slurry containing dispersed CdS

Reactions
Cadmium sulfide can be dissolved in acids.
CdS  +  2 HCl   →   CdCl2  +  H2S

When solutions of sulfide containing dispersed CdS particles are irradiated with light, hydrogen gas is generated:
 H2S → H2 + S       ΔHf = +9.4 kcal/mol
The proposed mechanism involves the electron/hole pairs created when incident light is absorbed by the cadmium sulfide followed by these reacting with water and sulfide:
Production of an electron–hole pair
CdS + hν → e− + h+ 
Reaction of electron
2e− + 2H2O → H2 + 2OH−
Reaction of hole
2h+ + S2− → S

Structure and physical properties
Cadmium sulfide has, like zinc sulfide, two crystal forms. The more stable hexagonal wurtzite structure (found in the mineral Greenockite) and the cubic zinc blende structure (found in the mineral Hawleyite). In both of these forms the cadmium and sulfur atoms are four coordinate. There is also a high pressure form with the NaCl rock salt structure.

Cadmium sulfide is a direct band gap semiconductor (gap 2.42 eV). The proximity of its band gap to visible light wavelengths gives it a coloured appearance. As well as this obvious property other properties result:
the conductivity increases when irradiated, (leading to uses as a photoresistor)
when combined with a p-type semiconductor it forms the core component of a photovoltaic (solar) cell and a CdS/Cu2S solar cell was one of the first efficient cells to be reported (1954)
when doped with for example Cu+ ("activator") and Al3+ ("coactivator") CdS luminesces under electron beam excitation (cathodoluminescence) and is used as phosphor
both polymorphs are piezoelectric and the hexagonal is also pyroelectric
electroluminescence
CdS crystals can act as a gain medium in solid state laser
In thin-film form, CdS can be combined with other layers for use in certain types of solar cells. CdS was also one of the first semiconductor materials to be used for thin-film transistors (TFTs). However interest in compound semiconductors for TFTs largely waned after the emergence of amorphous silicon technology in the late 1970s.
Thin films of CdS can be piezoelectric and have been used as transducers which can operate at frequencies in the GHz region.
Nanoribbons of CdS show a net cooling due annihilation of phonons, during anti-Stokes luminescence at ~510 nm. As a result, a maximum temperature drop of 40 and 15 K has been demonstrated when the nanoribbons are pumped with a 514 or 532 nm laser.

Applications

Pigment

CdS is used as pigment in plastics, showing good thermal stability, light and weather fastness, chemical resistance and high opacity. As a pigment, CdS is known as cadmium yellow (CI pigment yellow 37). About 2000 tons are produced annually as of 1982, representing about 25% of the cadmium processed commercially.

Historical use in art
The general commercial availability of cadmium sulfide from the 1840s led to its adoption by artists, notably Van Gogh, Monet (in his London series and other works) and Matisse (Bathers by a River 1916–1919). The presence of cadmium in paints has been used to detect forgeries in paintings alleged to have been produced prior to the 19th century.

CdS-CdSe solutions
CdS and CdSe form solid solutions with each other. Increasing amounts of cadmium selenide, gives pigments verging toward red, for example CI pigment orange 20 and CI pigment red 108.Such solid solutions are components of photoresistors (light dependent resistors) sensitive to visible and near infrared light.

Safety
Cadmium sulfide is toxic, especially dangerous when inhaled as dust, and cadmium compounds in general are classified as carcinogenic.  Problems of biocompatibility have been reported when CdS is used as colors in tattoos. CdS has an LD50 of approximately 7,080 mg/kg in rats - which is higher than other cadmium compounds due to its low solubility.

References

External links

 Cadmium(II) sulphide information at Webelements
 IARC Monograph: "Cadmium and Cadmium Compounds" Last access November 2005.
 International Chemical Safety Card 0404
 National Pollutant Inventory - Cadmium and compounds
  Report by the Academy of Medical Sciences to the Chief Scientific Adviser, Ministry of Defence on the zinc cadmium sulphide dispersion trials undertaken in the United Kingdom between 1953 and 1964.

Cadmium compounds
Sulfides
Inorganic compounds
Inorganic pigments
II-VI semiconductors
IARC Group 1 carcinogens
Phosphors and scintillators
Zincblende crystal structure
Wurtzite structure type
Glass dyes